Nicolet Bankshares is a U.S. regional bank holding company based in Green Bay, Wisconsin. They are the parent company of Nicolet National Bank, the second largest Wisconsin based bank.

As of June 30, 2021, it had over $6.1 billion in assets.

History
Nicolet Bankshares was founded in November 2000, after founders Bob Atwell and Mike Daniels felt that the local bank they worked for was getting away from community banking, which they felt was important. In 2010, Nicolet acquired four branches from Anchor Bank. In 2013, they acquired both Mid-Wisconsin Bank and the Bank of Wausau.

In 2015, the company would merge with Baylake Bank, with the new company taking the Nicolet National Bank name. On April 12, 2016, the shareholders of both banks voted in favor of merging the two banks. The $140 million deal closed on April 29, 2016.

In February 2020, Nicolet Bankshares announced plans to acquire West Bend, Wisconsin-based Commerce State Bank and its four branches in a deal valued at $129.6 million. Three months later in May 2020, Nicolet terminated its agreement to acquire Commerce State Bank citing the impact of coronavirus and falling stock price for the publicly traded Nicolet Bank.

On September 3, 2021, Nicolet completed a merger with Mackinac Financial Corporation, headquartered in Manistique, Michigan and operating as mBank with branches in Michigan's Upper Peninsula and northern Lower Peninsula. Nicolet shuttered the mBank branches in Menominee, Alanson, Kaleva, Mio, West Ishpeming, Negaunee, and the McClellan Avenue branch in Marquette. It also sold the Birmingham branch and lending office in Metro Detroit to the Bank of Ann Arbor.

References

External links

Banks based in Wisconsin
Companies based in Green Bay, Wisconsin
Companies listed on the New York Stock Exchange
Economy of the Midwestern United States
2000 establishments in the United States